The 10th Infantry Division (10e DI) was an infantry division of the French Army which took part in the Napoleonic Wars, First World War, and Second World War.

At the beginning of the First World War, it was mobilised in the 5th Military Region and formed part of the 5th Army Corps from August 1914 to November 1918.

The division was reconstituted, mainly of troops of Parisian FFI/Francs-Tireurs and Partisans (French Communists) origin, on 1 October 1944, in the Nevers region under the command of General Pierre Billotte. Originally, it was to include:
 Three infantry regiments:
5th Infantry Regiment - Lieutenant-colonel Emblanc
 24th Infantry Regiment - Lieutenant-colonel Bablon
 46th Infantry Regiment
 32nd Regiment of Artillery,
 18th Regiment of Dragons.

The 46th Infantry Regiment was quickly replaced by the 4th Demi-Brigade de Chasseurs of Commander Petit, made up of the 4th BCP and the 1er BCP of Paris.

It was later integrated into the 1st Army of General Jean de Lattre de Tassigny, under the wider banner of the French Liberation Army.

The division took part in the final liberation of the Colmar Pocket (January 20 - February 9, 1945), taking 32 casualties. Sent then to the Atlantic coast, it helped liberate the last pockets of resistance around the ports. In Germany, it was assigned responsibility for the region of Koblenz as part of the French occupation zone. At the request of General Billotte to COMAC, Colonel Henri Rol-Tanguy, commander of the divisional infantry, was subsequently made assistant to the commander of the military government of the district of Koblenz.

The division was part of the occupation troops in Germany until its dissolution on April 30, 1946. During this period the division was assigned to the 2nd Army Corps.

References 

Infantry divisions of France
Military units and formations disestablished in 1946